Professor Bubble was a live-action British pre-school series that aired on GMTV as part of its weekend children's programming block. It ran in 1996 and lasted for a series of 65 twenty-minute episodes. The series was later re-run on Tiny Living in 2000.

About the series 
Professor Bubble was a live-action series that focused on a professor of the same name who was trying to create a book called The A–Z of Everything. The Professor has launched his house into the clouds, where it landed on Cloud 9. He observes the world and gathers information through the "bubblescope", a telescope that was created at the bottom of Cloud 9. The Professor is aided by his three helpers, Beamer, Mouse, and Quill, whose antics on Cloud 9 provide links to live-action educational segments. The series also contains scenes from the outside world with songs and stories from a character called Chromety, who appears and vanishes by holding her nose.

Episodes (not in chronological order) 
The episodes below are uploaded to YouTube by VideotapeFTW

 Treasure (1996)
 Astronauts (1996)
 Water (1996)
 Bed (1996)
 Body Language (1996)

See also
Puppetry
Children's television series

References

1996 British television series debuts
1997 British television series endings
1990s British children's television series
British preschool education television series
British television shows featuring puppetry
Breakfast television in the United Kingdom
ITV children's television shows
Television series by Mattel Creations